Watermelon is a plant and its edible fruit.

Watermelon may also refer to:

Watermelon (film), a 2003 British television adaptation of the Marian Keyes novel (see below)
The Watermelon, a 2008 American film
"Watermelon" (Eureka Seven), a 2006 television episode
Watermelon Records, an American record label
Watermelon Slim (born 1949), American blues musician
Watermelon, a 1995 novel by Marian Keyes
WaterMelon, developer of the video game Pier Solar and the Great Architects
A pejorative nickname for eco-socialists

See also
Watermelon Creek (disambiguation)
Watermelon Man (disambiguation)